Villa Pessina is an eclectic villa located in Tremezzo on the shores of Lake Como, Italy.

History 
The villa was built in the 1920s on behalf of the Pessina family. The identity of its designers is not confidently known, nevertheless its stylistic similarity to the more famous Villa La Gaeta, designed by brothers Gino and Adolfo Coppedè, has fueled over the years numerous plagiarism allegations. These may as well have led to legal litigations, even though there is no clear evidence about that. It is known, instead, that the villa was built by the same construction company that built Villa La Gaeta.

Description 
The building features an eclectic style that combines Gothic Revival and Art Nouveau elements. Light stone, bricks and wood are used in the façades in the decoration. A large tower with biforas crowned by a loggia characterizes the façade overlooking the lake.

Gallery

References

External links

Pessina
Tremezzina